The Anchorage Metropolitan Statistical Area, as defined by the United States Census Bureau, is an area consisting of the Municipality of Anchorage and the Matanuska-Susitna Borough in the south central region of Alaska.

As of the 2010 census, the metropolitan statistical area (MSA) had a population of 380,821. However, 2016 population estimates increase that number to more than 400,000.

Communities

Places with more than 25,000 inhabitants
 Anchorage (principal city)

Places with 10,000 to 25,000 inhabitants
 Knik-Fairview

Places with 5,000 to 10,000 inhabitants
 Gateway
 Lakes
 Meadow Lakes
 Palmer
 Tanaina
 Wasilla

Places with 2,500 to 5,000 inhabitants
 Big Lake
 Butte
 Fishhook

Places with 1,000 to 2,500 inhabitants
 Farm Loop
 Houston
 Lazy Mountain
 Susitna North
 Sutton-Alpine
 Willow

Places with less than 1,000 inhabitants
 Buffalo Soapstone
 Chase
 Chickaloon
 Eureka Roadhouse
 Glacier View
 Knik River
 Lake Louise
 Petersville
 Point MacKenzie
 Skwentna
 Susitna (including Alexander Creek)
 Talkeetna
 Trapper Creek

Demographics
As of the census of 2010, there were 380,821 people residing within the MSA. The racial makeup of the MSA was 75.08% White, 4.88% African American, 6.95% Native American (a category that also includes Alaska Natives), 4.65% Asian, 0.78% Pacific Islander, 1.94% from other races, and 5.72% from two or more races. Hispanics or Latinos of any race were 5.10% of the population.

The median income for a household in the MSA was $53,384, and the median income for a family was $60,311. Males had a median income of $43,287 versus $30,573 for females. The per capita income for the MSA was $23,196.

See also

 Alaska census statistical areas

References

 
Metropolitan areas of Alaska
Geography of Anchorage, Alaska
Geography of Matanuska-Susitna Borough, Alaska